The 2016 World RX of Germany was the eleventh round of the third season of the FIA World Rallycross Championship. The event was held at the Estering in Buxtehude, Lower Saxony. Mattias Ekström won his maiden World Championship with a round to spare, holding a 30-point buffer to nearest rival Petter Solberg.

Heats

Semi-finals
Semi-Final 1

Semi-Final 2

Final

Standings after the event

References

External links

|- style="text-align:center"
|width="35%"|Previous race:2016 World RX of Latvia
|width="40%"|FIA World Rallycross Championship2016 season
|width="35%"|Next race:2016 World RX of Argentina
|- style="text-align:center"
|width="35%"|Previous race:2015 World RX of Germany
|width="40%"|World RX of Germany
|width="35%"|Next race:2017 World RX of Germany
|- style="text-align:center"

Germany
2016 in German motorsport
October 2016 sports events in Europe